Acidimangrovimonas indica is a Gram-negative, strictly aerobic, chemoheterotrophic and motile bacterium from the genus of Acidimangrovimonas which has been isolated from a deep-sea hydrothermal vent from the Southwest Indian Ridge in China.

References

Rhodobacteraceae
Bacteria described in 2014